The Ministry of Labour, Public Service and Human Resource Development is a ministry of the Government of South Sudan. The incumbent minister is Awut Deng Acuil, while Kwong Danhier Gatluak serves as deputy minister.

List of Ministers of Labour, Public Service and Human Resource Development

References

Labour, Public Service and Human Resource Development
South Sudan, Labour, Public Service and Human Resource Development
South Sudan, Labour, Public Service and Human Resource Development